John "Hopper" Hopkins (born May 22, 1983) is a former motorcycle road racer based in the United States. During 2017 he raced in the British Superbike Championship aboard a Ducati 1199 Panigale for Moto Rapido Racing, but suffered injuries from a crash at the season-finale race meeting in October, meaning he could not participate during 2018. He has not made a full recovery, which has so far precluded hopes of a comeback, but he has become involved in rider coaching.

From 2020, Hopkins became a rider-coach for American Racing team helping Joe Roberts and Marcos Ramirez in Moto2.

In a 2007 interview, he was questioned about being regarded as Anglo-American, with the interviewer commenting: "A lot of people don't understand your being British. As I understand it, your entire family moved over here from England, and you were raised here as a British family in America".

After riding a Ducati in the British Superbike Championship during the 2015 season, in 2016 he raced a Yamaha YZF-R1 for Tommy Hill's THM team partnered by Stuart Easton.

Hopkins raced previously in MotoGP, the AMA Superbike Championship, and the Superbike World Championship. He first raced in MotoGP during 2002 for the Red Bull Yamaha WCM team on a two-stroke 500 cc bike, and joined the factory Suzuki squad a year later for a five-year spell. He raced for the Kawasaki MotoGP team in 2008, but they dropped him for 2009 due to the global economic crisis and the company's uncompetitive showings. He has subsequently raced in both the World and British Superbike championships, finishing second in the 2011 British Superbike Championship season although injuries and alcohol problems have affected his results.

He was born to parents from Acton.

Early life
Hopkins began riding Motocross bikes as a child and won his first race on a MiniBike in 1986, switching to road racing full-time in 1999. Hopkins proposed to his girlfriend Ashleigh in the summer of 2007 on her 21st birthday. They married in Las Vegas in December 2007.

He is featured in the 2003 documentary film, Faster.

He is featured in the film The Doctor, the Tornado and the Kentucky Kid 2006.

Career

MotoGP World Championship

2002
The 2002 season saw Hopkins join the WCM RedBull Yamaha team alongside multiple race winner Garry McCoy. The team was using Yamaha YZR500 motorcycles on lease from Yamaha. Overall the YZR500 was considered to be uncompetitive that year, due to a change in the regulations allowing 990 cc four-stroke motorcycles to race against 500 cc two-stroke motorcycles. Although the two-strokes held (on average) a 10 kg weight advantage over the four-strokes, they had between 30 and 50 less hp depending on the engine configuration used for the racetrack. Hopkins finished the season ranked 15th, with 58 points, which put him 25 points clear of his teammate McCoy.

2003
In 2003 Hopkins joined the Suzuki factory racing team. This year he would ride a 990 cc V4 four-stroke. In 2003 John was teamed with 2000 500cc world champion Kenny Roberts, Jr. Although he was racing a four-stroke this year, the results did not seem to come as one would have expected. There are many theories for this, including the Suzuki's lack of power and its tendency to wear out tires faster than other bikes. This year also saw Hopkins involved in a turn 1 crash at the Japanese Grand Prix at Motegi, he was accused of causing this crash, and was suspended for one race. This suspension resulted in a DNS (did not start) at the Malaysian Grand Prix. Also noteworthy for the 2003 season was the crash in Italy where Kenny Roberts, Jr.'s GSV-R Suzuki suffered an engine management failure and the bike launched into Hopkins, putting both GSV-R's out of the race. At the end of the season, Hopkins finished in 17th place with 29 points. This finish put him 2 places and 7 points ahead of his teammate Kenny Roberts, Jr.

2004
The technology and technical advancement of the GSV-R was further developed in 2004. Most of the refinements took place in the engine management package, making the bike easier to ride. Towards the end of the year, the GSV-R was showing clear improvements, allowing Hopkins to move up the standings. Unfortunately it also saw several mechanical failures, which effectively undid the hard work to develop the motorcycle. Having qualified on the front row at Motegi, he was eliminated in a first-corner crash.  Overall, he finished 16th.

2005

Hopkins continued with Suzuki in 2005, as the team showed promising signs after the arrival of Paul Denning as team boss following Denning's success with Suzuki's British Superbike team. Hopkins briefly led at Donington, but his best result was a 5th place at Motegi, and he was 14th overall. Qualifying results were often better than race results, largely due to Bridgestone tires being better suited to short runs.

2006
Hopkins remained at Suzuki, now backed by Rizla, where he was joined by new teammate Chris Vermeulen. He enjoyed his best season yet. Hopkins finished the 2006 season in 10th place overall with 116 points. 
Hopkins had one pole position this season, at Assen. His best finishes were in China and in Catalunya, where he finished fourth.

2007
Continuing with Rizla Suzuki, Hopkins set near-lap-record times aboard the new 800 cc motorcycle, and was labeled the dark horse by Colin Edwards. On February 15, 2007, he fractured his wrist after falling while testing at the Jerez circuit in Spain, but returned for the start of the season.

Hopkins completed his first MotoGP podium finish at the Shanghai circuit in China, finishing in 3rd place – 3.6 seconds behind Valentino Rossi but 7.6 seconds ahead of 2006 event winner Dani Pedrosa.  He finished as 4th overall in the 2007 season, two places ahead of Vermeulen and one behind Rossi.

2008
For 2008 he joined Kawasaki Racing Team. Explaining the decision, Rizla Suzuki boss Paul Denning suggested that "There are reasons for that other than performance," highlighting commercial concerns in particular. Hopkins crashed heavily at Assen, fracturing his ankle.

Prior to 2009 season, Kawasaki made the decision to halt MotoGP racing activities because of the global economic crisis, meaning that John Hopkins would not have a ride for the 2009 season.

2011
Hopkins returned to MotoGP in the Spanish motorcycle Grand Prix in April 2011 as a temporary replacement for Álvaro Bautista in the Suzuki team.

Superbike World Championship

2009
After the Kawasaki team pulled out of MotoGP, Hopkins secured a mid season ride on the Stiggy Racing Honda replacing Roberto Rolfo. Hopkins scored points during his first round in Valencia. At the next round in Assen, Hopkins would fall and dislocate his hip, Hopkins then wouldn't return until San Marino  where he couldn't complete the weekend's racing. After a career best finish in the first race at Donington, Hopkins, who was still hurt, couldn't complete the second race. Following 2 retirements at the Brno round, Hopkins would suffer a horror crash at the Nürburgring, being run over after he was taken out by Makoto Tamada and Broc Parkes, Hopkins was unconscious for ten minutes but luckily sustained no serious injuries. The Stiggy Honda team then withdrew from the World Superbike paddock leaving Hopkins once again without a ride for 2010.

2011
In 2011 Hopkins rode his Samsung Crescent Suzuki at the Silverstone World Superbike round. Hopkins was fast from the start being fastest in free practice sessions, capturing his first Superbike World Championship pole position with a new circuit record lap.

2012
In January 2012, Hopkins had his right ring-finger amputated just above the first joint up from the knuckle.

He missed the first race of the season after a testing crash, ironically breaking the knuckle below the stump from the finger he had chopped off at the start of the year.

2013
In October 2012, Hopkins announced that he would be taking the 2013 season off to recover from his injuries. 
In April 2013, Hopkins had hip replacement surgery following a heavy crash at Monza, but announced at the Le Mans MotoGP event in May that he would be testing again within two months.

AMA Superbike Championship

2010
After one season in SBK John Hopkins returned to United States racing - he was considered a superstar in the AMA. He raced for the M4 Monster Suzuki team.

British Superbike Championship

2011
For the 2011 season Hopkins raced in the British Superbike Championship. He rode for the Crescent Suzuki team. At Oulton Park he won the second race making history, being the first American to win a British Superbike race. Hopkins made history yet again at the new Snetterton 300 where he won the first British Superbike race.

Hopkins came within 0.006 seconds of winning the title, losing out to Tommy Hill on the last lap of the final round at Brands Hatch.

2014
On October 29, 2013, it was announced that Hopkins, after taking a year out to recover from multiple injuries, would return to the British Superbike Championship for 2014 having signed to ride for Tyco Suzuki.

2015
In July 2015; Hopkins joined the MCE British Superbike Championship, replacing Jakub Smrz for the Lloyds British Moto Rapido Ducati. His first race took place at Brands Hatch (Round 6) where he placed 6th in Race 1 and had a DNF in Race 2.

Life after racing

Coaching career

After injuries prevented Hopkins from a comeback in racing he was offered a position as the riders' coach and race director for the American Racing team in Moto2 for the 2020 season.

Hopkins arrival had an immediate impact upon American Racing's Joe Roberts, who at the time was the only American racing in any motorcycle road racing world championship. Roberts would take his first two pole positions, his first podium finish, and would be a consistent top ten finisher under Hopkins' tutelage. Hopkins nearly moved back to up to MotoGP when Roberts was in negotiations with Aprilia, with Aprilia making a concession to allow Hopkins to remain Roberts' rider coach should Roberts move up to MotoGP. Roberts ultimately declined the move to MotoGP and Hopkins stayed with American Racing.

He is the riders' coach for series veteran Marcos Ramirez and American newcomer Cameron Beaubier.

Autobiography
Hopkins' autobiography was released in September 2021.

Career statistics

Grand Prix motorcycle racing

By season

By class

Races by year
(key) (Races in bold indicate pole position, races in italics indicate fastest lap)

Superbike World Championship

Races by year
(key) (Races in bold indicate pole position, races in italics indicate fastest lap)

AMA Superbike Championship

Races by year
(key)

British Superbike Championship

Races by year
(key) (Races in bold indicate pole position, races in italics indicate fastest lap)

1. – Hopkins was not entered for the Cadwell race due to an injury he sustained during his wildcard ride for Suzuki at the MotoGP event in Brno.

2. – Hopkins qualified for "The Showdown" part of the BSB season, thus before the Donington Park round he was awarded 500 points plus the podium credits he had gained throughout the season. Podium credits are given to anyone finishing 1st, 2nd or 3rd, with 3,2 and 1 points awarded respectively.

References

External links

1983 births
Living people
People from San Diego County, California
American motorcycle racers
American amputees
Kawasaki Motors Racing MotoGP riders
Suzuki MotoGP riders
British Superbike Championship riders
Superbike World Championship riders
AMA Superbike Championship riders
MotoGP World Championship riders